Karnaukhovo is a rural locality (a selo) in Zaboryinskoye Rural Settlement, Beryozovsky District, Perm Krai, Russia. The population was 165 as of 2010. There are 3 streets.

Geography 
Karnaukhovo is located 13 km southwest of  Beryozovka (the district's administrative centre) by road. Issinyayevo is the nearest rural locality.

References 

Rural localities in Beryozovsky District, Perm Krai